Anbu Magan is a 1961 Indian Tamil-language film directed by T. Prakash Rao. The film stars A. Nageswara Rao and Savithri. It was released on 27 January 1961.

Plot

Cast 
The list is adapted from the film's Song book.

Male cast
A. Nageswara Rao
K. A. Thangavelu
S. V. Sahasranamam
K. Sarangapani
M. N. Krishnan
Karikol Raj

Female cast
Savithri
M. N. Rajam
P. Kannamba
M. Saroja
Honey Irani

Guest artistes
V. Nagayya
D. Balasubramaniam
A. Karunanidhi

Production 
The film was produced by T. V. S. Raju under the banner Pragathi Art Productions and was directed by T. Prakash Rao. Murasoli Maran wrote the screenplay and dialogues. Kamal Ghosh was in charge of cinematography while the editing was done by N. M. Shankar. Audiography was done by A. Krishnan. Kaladhar was the Art Director. The film was shot and processed at Vijaya Vauhini Studios.

Soundtrack 
Music was composed by T. Chalapathi Rao while the lyrics were penned by Kannadasan, Udumalai Narayana Kavi, A. S. Rajagopal and Subbu Arumugam. The songs My Dear Lady Pothunga and Vanna Mayil Vel Murugan did not take place in the film and were not listed in the film's song book either.

References

External links 

1960s Tamil-language films
Films directed by T. Prakash Rao
Films scored by T. Chalapathi Rao